Yakir Shina (born 25 September 1985) is an Israeli footballer who plays for Hapoel Marmorek. He had been loaned to Hapoel Ramat Gan, Hapoel Acre, Maccabi Ahi Nazareth and played for Beitar Tel Aviv Ramla, Hapoel Bnei Lod and Hapoel Ra'anana, and is a defender.

Yakir began his career with Maccabi Tel Aviv. He moved to Maccabi Ahi Nazareth in 2008. In the 2008-2009 season Maccabi Ahi Nazareth played in Liga Leumit and promoted to Ligat Ha'al and the fans of the team insisted that they wanted him to stay in the team at least for one more season. In the first match in the 2009/2010 season he scored a goal and showed that he is very talented player. After the match, scouts from Alemannia Aachen were interested by his fast and "fighting" playing style. Unfortunately in the second game against Bnei Yehuda Tel Aviv F.C. he was injured in the 40th minute and missed the rest of the season.

Honours
Liga Leumit
Winner (1): 2016-17

References

External links

1985 births
Living people
Association football defenders
Israeli Jews
Israeli footballers
Maccabi Tel Aviv F.C. players
Hapoel Bnei Lod F.C. players
Hapoel Acre F.C. players
Maccabi Ahi Nazareth F.C. players
Hapoel Ramat Gan F.C. players
Beitar Tel Aviv Bat Yam F.C. players
Hapoel Ra'anana A.F.C. players
Maccabi Netanya F.C. players
Hapoel Rishon LeZion F.C. players
Hapoel Marmorek F.C. players
Israeli beach soccer players
Israeli Premier League players
Liga Leumit players
Footballers from Rishon LeZion